Georges Vasilievich Florovsky (Russian: Гео́ргий Васи́льевич Флоро́вский;  – August 11, 1979) was a Russian Orthodox priest, theologian, and historian.

Born in the Russian Empire, he spent his working life in Paris (1920–1949) and New York (1949–1979). With Sergei Bulgakov, Vladimir Lossky, Justin Popović and Dumitru Stăniloae he was one of the more influential Eastern Orthodox Christian theologians of the mid-20th century. He was particularly concerned that modern Christian theology might receive inspiration from the lively intellectual debates of the patristic traditions of the undivided Church rather than from later Scholastic or Reformation categories of thought.

Life 
Georgiy Vasilievich Florovsky was born in Yelisavetgrad, Kherson Governorate, Russian Empire on 9 September 1893 as the fourth child of an Orthodox priest. He grew up in Odessa. Raised in an erudite environment, he learned English, German, French, Latin, Greek, and Hebrew while a schoolboy, and at eighteen he started to study philosophy and history. He graduated from the University of Odessa in 1916.

After his first graduation, he taught for three years at high schools in Odessa, and then made his full graduation including the licentia docendi at all universities in the Russian empire.

In 1919 Florovsky began to teach at the University of Odessa; but in 1920 his family was forced to leave Russia. Florovsky realized at that time that there would be no return for him, because Marxism did not accept the history and philosophy he taught. He was part of the emigration of Russian intelligentsia, which also included Nikolai Berdyaev, Sergei Bulgakov, Nicholas Lossky and his son Vladimir Lossky, Alexander Schmemann, and John Meyendorff (the last two of whom would follow him in the USA as Dean of Saint Vladimir's Orthodox Theological Seminary, New York).

In the 1920s Florovsky had a personal and vocational friendship with the existentialist philosopher Nikolai Berdyaev, but the two became  distanced later, through Berdyaev's not understanding Florovsky's ordination to the presbyterate (1932), and because of the critical attitude to Berdyaev's philosophy of religion expressed in Florovsky's Ways of Russian Theology (1937).

In 1924 Florovsky received his M.A. in Prague. In 1925 he became professor of patristics at the St. Serge Institute of Orthodox Theology in Paris. In this subject he found his vocation. The lively debates of the thinkers of the early Church became for him a benchmark for Christian  theology and exegesis, as well as a base for his critique of the ecumenical movement, and despite his not having earned an academic degree in theology (he was later awarded several honorary degrees) he would spend the rest of his life teaching at theological institutions. In 1932 Florovsky was ordained priest of the Eastern Orthodox Church. During the 1930s he undertook extensive research in European libraries and published in Russian valuable patristic studies, such as his book on 'Eastern fathers of the fourth century' (1931) and 'The Byzantine fathers fifth to eighth centuries' (1933). These were followed by his magnum opus, Ways of Russian Theology (1937). In this work he questioned the Western-European Christian influences of scholasticism, pietism, and idealism on Orthodox, and especially Russian, Christian theology, and called for its reformulation in the light of patristic writings. The work was received with enthusiasm or condemnation—there was no neutral attitude to it among Russian émigrés. One of his most prominent critics was Nikolai Berdyaev. Florovsky remained professor of patristics at the Institute until 1939, and from 1939 to 1948 taught there as professor of dogmatics.

In 1949 Florovsky moved to the United States of America, to take a position as Dean of Saint Vladimir's Orthodox Theological Seminary in New York City. There his development of the curriculum led to the Board of Regents of the University of the State of New York granting the Seminary an Absolute Charter in 1953.

In 1955 Florovsky was asked by his synod overseers to "lay down the deanship." He became a professor of divinity at Harvard University, and ended his academic years as a professor at Princeton University.

He died on 11 August 1979 in Princeton.

Works
 Eastern Fathers of the Fourth Century (1931. Paris)
 The Ways of Russian Theology (online)
 The Catholicity of the Church online
 The Lost Scriptural Mind online
 On Church and Tradition: An Eastern Orthodox View online
 St. John Chrysostom. The Prophet of Charity online 
 The Ascetic Ideal and the New Testament. Reflections on the Critique of the Theology of the Reformation online
 The Limits of the Church, Church Quarterly Review, 1933 (online)
 Following the Holy Fathers (Excerpt of The Collected Works of Georges Florovsky Vol. IV, "Patristic Theology and the Ethos of the Orthodox Church," Part II, p. 15-22) online
 St Gregory Palamas and the Tradition of the Fathers, 1961 online
 Revelation and Interpretation online
 Scripture and Tradition: an Orthodox View online
 The Work of the Holy Spirit in Revelation online
 Holy Icons online
 Collected works published 1972-1979 (vol. 1-5) in Belmont, Mass. by Nordland Pub., and 1987-1989 (vol. 6-14) in Vaduz, Europa by Büchervertriebsanstalt.
Collected Works. Volume 1: Bible, Church, Tradition
Collected Works. Volume 2: Christianity and Culture excerpts online
Collected Works. Volume 3: Creation and Redemption [excerpts online]
Collected Works. Volume 4: Aspects of Church History excerpts online
Collected Works. Volume 5: Ways of Russian Theology, Part I
Collected Works. Volume 6: Ways of Russian Theology, Part II
Collected Works. Volume 7: Eastern Fathers of the Fourth Century
Collected Works. Volume 8: Byzantine Fathers of the Fifth Century
Collected Works. Volume 9: Byzantine Fathers of the Sixth to Eight Centuries
Collected Works. Volume 10: Byzantine Ascetic and Spiritual Fathers
Collected Works. Volume 11: Theology and Literature
Collected Works. Volume 12: Philosophy
Collected Works. Volume 13: Ecumenism I: A Doctrinal Approach
Collected Works. Volume 14: Ecumenism II: An Historical Approach

See also
List of Russian philosophers
Eastern Orthodox Christian theology
Philosophers' ships

References

Further reading
 A. Blane, Georges Florovsky; Russian Intellectual and Orthodox Churchman (1993) .
 Peter A. Chamberas, "Georges Vasilievich Florovsky: Russian intellectual historian and orthodox theologian - 1893-1979 - Religious Historians, East and West", Modern Age, Winter 2003 (FindArticles online version).
 Steven Aguzzi, "Florovsky’s 'The Boundaries of the Church' in Dialogue with the Reformed Tradition: Toward a Catholic and Charismatic Ecumenical Ecclesiology," Ecumenical Trends; 39:3 (2010), 8–14.

External links 

 Collected Works of Fr Georges Florovsky, in part online
 
 
 John S. Romanides, F. Georges Florovsky, the theologian in service of the church in ecumenical dialogue Lecture at St. Vladimir's Seminary 23 May 1980
Harvard Divinity School Faculty Writings File: Georges Florovsky
Princeton University Library: Georges Florovsky Papers
St. Vladimir's Seminary Library: The Fr. Georges Florovsky Papers
Nikolai Berdyaev, Ortodoksia and Humanness, 1937, Critique of Florovsky's "The Way of the Russian Church"
 Matthew Baker, 'The Eternal ‘Spirit of the Son’: Barth, Florovsky and Torrance on the Filioque', in International Journal of Systematic Theology; 12:4 (2010 October), p. 382–403. 
 Matthew Baker and Nikolaos Asproulis, 'Secondary Bibliography of Scholarly Literature and Conferences on Florovsky', in ΘΕΟΛΟΓΙΑ: The Journal of the Holy Synod of the Church of Greece, 81/40, Vol. 4 (2010), pp. 557–396. 
 Fr. Georges Florovsky Orthodox Christian Theological Society: A graduate student organization of Princeton University dedicated to promoting the study of the life and work of Fr. Georges Florovsky and of Orthodox theology. 

1893 births
1979 deaths
Writers from Kropyvnytskyi
People from Yelisavetgradsky Uyezd
Eastern Orthodox theologians
American theologians
Eastern Orthodox priests in the United States
Eastern Orthodox writers
Schoolteachers from the Russian Empire
Emigrants from the Russian Empire to France
Christian writers
20th-century Eastern Orthodox priests
Academic staff of Odesa University